Galium uncinulatum, common name bristly bedstraw, is a species of plants in the Rubiaceae. It is native to Mexico, Guatemala, Costa Rica, Panama, Texas, and Arizona.

References

External links
Photo of herbarium specimen at Missouri Botanical Garden, collected in Nuevo León, Galium uncinulatum
Photo of herbarium specimen at Missouri Botanical Garden, isotype of Galium obstipum, synonym of Galium uncinulatum
US Department of Agriculture plants profile, bristly bedstraw
Gardening Europe

uncinulatum
Flora of Mexico
Flora of Guatemala
Flora of Costa Rica
Flora of Texas
Flora of Panama
Flora of Arizona
Plants described in 1830